The 2016 Netball Superleague season (known for sponsorship reasons as the Vitality Netball Superleague) was the eleventh season of the Netball Superleague. The league was won by Surrey Storm after defeating Manchester Thunder in the grand final. Thunder finished top of the table following the regular season. The league was sponsored by VitalityHealth.

Teams
This was Yorkshire Jets final season in the Netball Superleague. In June 2016 England Netball announced that Jets had lost their place in the league.

Regular season
The opening day of the regular season saw the introduction of Super Saturday. This saw the eight teams play all four Round 1 games at the Genting Arena in front of a 7,500 crowd. During the season Sky Sports broadcast several matches live on Monday nights. Manchester Thunder finished top of the table following the regular season.

Final table

Play-offs

Semi-finals

3rd/4th place play off

Grand Final

Team of the Season
A panel of Sky Sports commentators and pundits including Katharine Merry, Caroline Barker, Karen Atkinson, Tamsin Greenway and Jess Thirlby selected a 2016 Team of the Season.

See also
 2016 Surrey Storm season
 2016 Team Bath netball season

References

 
2016
2016 in English netball
2016 in Welsh women's sport